Ravshan Kulob is a football club based in Kulob, Tajikistan, formed in 1965 as FK Ansol Kulob. The club was renamed FK Olimp-Ansol Kulob in 2003, before changing to its current name in 2005. They currently play in the Ligai Olii Tojikiston and play their home matches at Kulob Central Stadium.

History

Domestic history

Continental history

Current squad
''

Honours
Tajik League (2): 2012, 2013
Tajik Cup (2): 1994, 2020

References

External links
  Official club website

tj:Равшан

Football clubs in Tajikistan